The 2016 Lebanese Elite Cup is the 19th edition of this football tournament in Lebanon. The competition started on 6 August through to the final on 21 August. This tournament includes the six best teams from the 2015–16 Lebanese Premier League season.

Group stage

Group A

Group B

Final stage

Semi finals

Final

Lebanese Elite Cup seasons
Elite